is a passenger railway station in located in the city of Takaishi, Osaka Prefecture, Japan, operated by West Japan Railway Company (JR West).

Lines

Station layout
The station consists of one elevated side platform with the station building underneath. The station is staffed.

Adjacent stations

|-
!colspan=5|JR West

History
It was renamed  on August 1, 1941 and to its present name on May 1, 1944. With the privatization of the Japan National Railways (JNR) on April 1, 1987, the station came under the aegis of the West Japan Railway Company.

Passenger statistics
In fiscal 2019, the station was used by an average of 5281 passengers daily (boarding passengers only).

Surrounding area
The station is connected with Hagoromo Station operated by Nankai Railway.
 Hamadera Park
Hagoromo University of International Studies
Hagoromo Gakuen Junior and Senior High School

See also
List of railway stations in Japan

References

External links

 Higashi-Hagoromo Station information 

Railway stations in Osaka Prefecture
Railway stations in Japan opened in 1929
Takaishi, Osaka